WTLQ-FM (97.7 MHz) is a commercial radio station located in Punta Rassa, Florida, broadcasting to the Fort Myers area. WTLQ-FM airs a hispanic urban music format branded as "Latino 97.7".

On October 5, 2022, after being off the air due to Hurricane Ian making landfall in the Fort Myers area, WTLQ-FM's format temporarily moved to WHEL (93.7). WTLQ-FM returned to the air on October 21, allowing WHEL to resume its regular country music programming.

References

External links
Official website
977Latino Facebook Page
Broadcast Center | Fort Myers Broadcasting Co. | Sun Broadcasting, Inc.

Hispanic and Latino American culture in Florida
TLQ-FM
TLQ-FM
1999 establishments in Florida
Radio stations established in 1999